Carol Spackman Moss is a Democratic member of the Utah State House, representing the state's 37th house district in Holladay since 2000.

Early life and career
Before being elected to the Utah House of Representatives, Moss taught English at Olympus High School in Holladay, Utah (a suburb of Salt Lake City) for nearly 30 years.

Moss has bachelor's and master's degrees from the University of Utah.

Political career
Moss was first elected in 2000. She previously served as the Assistant Minority Whip in the Utah House from 2004 to 2010.

During the 2016 legislative session, Moss served on the Higher Education Appropriations Subcommittee, the House Education Committee, the House Rules Committee, and the House Transportation Committee.

Elections
 2014 Moss won reelection against Republican nominee Ron Hilton, taking 60.3% of the vote.
 2010 Moss won reelection against Republican nominee Anne-Marie Lampropoulos, taking 51.6% of the vote.
 2010 Moss won reelection against Republican nominee Margrethe Peterson, taking 61% of the vote.
 2008 Moss won reelection against Republican nominee Linda Cooper, taking 63.1% of the vote.
 2006 Moss won reelection against Republican nominee Sandy Thackeray.
 2004 Moss won reelection against Republican nominee Brice (Derek) Carsno
 2002 Moss won reelection against Republican nominee Mark H. Steffensen.
 2000 Moss was elected, defeating Republican incumbent Ray Short.

2016 sponsored legislation

Moss passed four of the six bills she introduced, giving her a 66.7% passage rate. She also floor sponsored two bills during the 2016 General Session.

References

External links
Utah House of Representatives – Carol Spackman Moss official UT House profile
Project Vote Smart – Carol Spackman Moss profile
Follow the Money – Carol Spackman Moss
2006 2004 2002 2000 campaign contributions

Living people
University of Utah alumni
Democratic Party members of the Utah House of Representatives
American educators
Women state legislators in Utah
Women in Utah politics
21st-century American politicians
21st-century American women politicians
Year of birth missing (living people)
People from Holladay, Utah